Intralink is an international business development and innovation consultancy specialising in Asia.

Established in 1990, the company helps western businesses expand in China, Japan, South Korea, Taiwan and southeast Asia, Asian corporates to harness global innovation, and governments to grow their exports and attract investment. 

Intralink has its headquarters in Abingdon, near Oxford, UK, and offices in Shanghai, Beijing, Tokyo, Seoul, Taipei, Singapore, Sydney, Boston, Silicon Valley, Los Angeles, London, Paris, Poznan and Tel Aviv. Most of its employees, numbering over 130, are multilingual and based in Asia.

Sectors and clients 
Intralink's core sectors are electronics, medtech and life sciences, automotive, energy, software, telecoms, ecommerce, retail and manufacturing. Its clients in these fields span startups, mid-market firms and multinationals and include BT, Nissan, Philips, Hitachi, Bluetooth, Dyson, John Lewis and Hamleys.

The company also works with governments and economic development agencies to promote exports and attract foreign direct investment, with clients including the Canadian Government, several US states and the UK's Department for International Trade (DIT).

History

1990–1999 
The company was founded by former Jardine Matheson employee James Lawson at the tail end of the Japanese asset price bubble economy of the 1980s. Although the Japanese economy had (unknown at the time) entered what would later be called the ‘Lost Decades, Lawson was convinced that Japan had become a must-have market for European and US companies wanting to target its new status as a provider of products to the global market, both for western companies to supply to Japanese manufacturers and as a source of products and materials. Intralink’s first major success was with a Japanese manufacturer of hosiery into the UK high street. For the next decade, the company worked with a range of western companies which judged that, even though the Japan economic bubble had burst, post-war growth had raised Japanese purchasing power to parity with leading European companies.

2000–2009 
Moving into its second decade, Intralink continued working across a broad range of sectors in Japan but increasingly started to focus on areas of new technology. At the same time, it began replicating its success in the growing neighbouring powerhouse of China, which was already attracting interest from foreign companies. While Japan continued to be the main focus of the business, more and more foreign companies were moving sourcing and manufacturing to China. Intralink found a role performing supplier and partner benchmark and market landscaping projects for Western companies. It established an initial representative office in Shanghai in 2001, then a wholly foreign-owned entity in 2008.

2010 onwards 
With the rise of Chinese companies such as Huawei, ZTE, Lenovo and Haier selling own-branded products on global markets, the priority for western companies shifted from sourcing and manufacturing to getting their components, software and IP into the products of these Chinese brands. Intralink capitalised on this trend by working with western companies to develop and execute their sales and licensing strategies for the Chinese market.

Intralink moved into South Korea and Taiwan, establishing offices in both countries in 2010. South Korea, the other big Northeast Asian manufacturing economy, had experienced such spectacular growth that, by 2004, it had "joined the trillion-dollar club of world economies".

The company opened an office in Tel Aviv and Beijing in 2021, and in Singapore in 2022.

References 

Companies based in Oxford
Consulting firms established in 1990
1990 establishments in England